Galloway's Plan of Union was a plan to politically unite Great Britain and its North American colonies. The plan was put forward by Loyalist Joseph Galloway in the First Continental Congress of 1774 but was rejected. Galloway was a Pennsylvania delegate who wanted to keep the Thirteen Colonies in the British Empire.

General 
Galloway suggested the creation of an American colonial parliament to act together with the Parliament of Great Britain. The Grand Council would have to give formal consent to the latter's decisions, particularly on trade and taxation, thus giving it a veto.

The Colonial Parliament would consist of a President-General appointed by the Crown and delegates appointed by the colonial assemblies for three-year terms. The plan would have kept the British Empire together and allowed the colonies to have some say over their own affairs, including the inflammatory issue of taxation.

Galloway's Plan of Union was narrowly defeated by a vote of six to five on October 22, 1774. The appearance of the Suffolk Resolves at the Congress led to a polarization of discussion, with the radicals swiftly gaining the upper hand.

Galloway and Albany Plans 
The proposed Galloway Plan bore striking resemblance to the Albany Plan, a proposal by Galloway's fellow Pennsylvania delegate (and active correspondent) Benjamin Franklin at the Albany Congress in July 1754 to create a unified government for the Thirteen Colonies. The Albany Plan went beyond the original scope of the Albany Congress, which was to develop a plan of defense for the French and Indian War.

Aftermath 

Although as a delegate to the Continental Congress Galloway was a moderate, when his Plan of Union (despite its removal of British Parliamentary sovereignty) was rejected, Galloway moved increasingly towards Loyalism. After 1778, he lived in Britain, where he acted as a leader of the Loyalist movement and an advisor to the government. Once Britain's Parliament accepted American independence as part of the Peace of Paris (1783), many Loyalists went into forced exile, and Galloway permanently settled in Britain.

References

External links
Original text of Galloway's Plan of Union

 "A candid examination of the mutual claims of Great-Britain, and the Colonies, with a plan of accommodation on constitutional principles," by Joseph Galloway

1774 in politics
1774 in the Thirteen Colonies
Continental Congress
Proposed countries